This page is a list of 2019 UCI WorldTeams and riders. These teams are competing in the 2019 UCI World Tour.

Teams overview 
The 18 WorldTeams in 2019 are:

Riders 
The composition of the 18 teams is as follows:





































See also

Notes

References 

 2019 in men's road cycling
 List of 2019 UCI Professional Continental and Continental teams
 List of 2019 UCI Women's Teams

2019 in men's road cycling
2019